(born 3 July 1942) is a Japanese professional golfer.

Kitta played on the Japan Golf Tour, winning once. He also won the Japan Open before the establishment of the Tour.

Professional wins (4)

Japan Golf Tour wins (1)

Other wins (3)
1970 Japan Open Golf Championship
1979 Hyogo Prefecture Open
1980 Hyogo Prefecture Open

External links

Mitsuhiro Kitta at the PGA of Japan official website (in Japanese)

Japanese male golfers
Japan Golf Tour golfers
Sportspeople from Hyōgo Prefecture
1942 births
Living people